The Holcim Foundation for Sustainable Construction is a non-profit organization. Its goal is to raise awareness of the role that architecture, engineering, urban planning and construction have in achieving a sustainable built future. The organization encourages and rewards sustainable responses to the technological, environmental, socioeconomic, and cultural issues affecting building and construction. The Holcim Foundation for Sustainable Construction promotes thought leadership on a greener, smarter, circular, and more inclusive built environment.

The two main initiatives of the Foundation are the Holcim Forums (a series of academic conferences) and the Holcim Awards (a US$1 million competition for sustainable construction projects and visionary concepts awarded since its 7th cycle every two years).

History
The organization was established in 2003 in Zurich, Switzerland with Holcim Ltd as its sole sponsor. Holcim Ltd and Lafarge S.A. completed their global merger and launched LafargeHolcim in July 2015. The name of the Foundation was changed to LafargeHolcim Foundation. LafargeHolcim launched a new group identity and changed name to the Holcim Group in July 2021. As a consequence, the Holcim Foundation for Sustainable Construction also adapted its name and identity. The initiatives of the Foundation operate in a three-year cycle.

Holcim Awards for Sustainable Construction

The Holcim Awards for Sustainable Construction is an international competition that seeks projects and visionary concepts in sustainable construction. It offers US$1 million dollars in prize money in each two-year cycle. Eligible for entry are projects in buildings and civil engineering works; landscape, urban design and infrastructure; and materials, products and construction technologies.

There are two categories: The main category is open to architects, planners, engineers, and project owners that showcase sustainable responses to technological, environmental, socioeconomic and cultural issues affective contemporary building and construction. The winners of Holcim Awards Main category prizes (Awards Gold, Silver, Bronze and Acknowledgements) are automatically nominated for the Global Holcim Awards. The Next Generation category is open for students and young professionals not older than 30. The category seeks visionary design concepts and bold ideas including design studio and research work.

The first Holcim Awards took place from 2004 until 2006; the second Holcim Awards from 2007 until 2009; the third Holcim Awards from 2008 until 2012; the fourth Holcim Awards from 2013 until 2015; the fifth LafargeHolcim Awards from 2017 until 2018; and the sixth Holcim Awards from 2020 until 2021. The winners of the Next Generation prizes were announced in June 2021 and the Main category prize winners will be announced in November 2021.

The competition was known as the Holcim Awards from 2003 until 2015. Holcim Ltd and Lafarge S.A. completed their global merger and launched LafargeHolcim in July 2015. The name of the Foundation was changed to LafargeHolcim Foundation, and the competition became the LafargeHolcim Awards. With the launch of a new corporate identity of the group to Holcim Ltd in July 2021, the Foundation changed its name to the Holcim Foundation for Sustainable Construction in July 2021.

Holcim Forum for Sustainable Construction
The Holcim Forum is a series of symposia on sustainable construction. The event is an academic platform for architects, engineers, construction professionals and specialists. It supports sustainable construction in the scientific field, among experts in the construction sector, business and society, and promotes interdisciplinary dialog, bring forward new ideas, and examine potential solutions.

Past forums
 2004: Inaugural Holcim Forum on "Basic Needs" at ETH Zurich in Switzerland
 2007: 2nd International Holcim Forum on "Urban_Trans_Formation" at Tongji University in Shanghai, China
 2010: 3rd International Holcim Forum on "Re-inventing construction" at Universidad Iberoamericana (IBERO) in Mexico City, Mexico
 2013: 4th International Holcim Forum on "Economy of Sustainable Construction" at Indian Institute of Technology (IIT Bombay), in Mumbai, India
 2016: 5th International Holcim Forum on "Infrastructure Space" at Wayne State University in Detroit, MI, USA
 2019: 6th International Holcim Forum on "Re-materializing Construction" at The American University in Cairo (AUC), Egypt

Upcoming forum
The next Holcim Forum will be held in early 2023 in Latin America.

Target issues for sustainable construction
The Holcim Foundation measures and evaluates sustainable construction using five "target issues". Three of these align with the triple bottom line concept of balanced social, environmental and economic performance. The two further target issues cover the contextual and aesthetic impact, and innovation and transferability.

Innovation and transferability - "Progress"
Projects must demonstrate innovative approaches to sustainable development by pushing the envelope of practice and exploring new disciplinary frontiers. Breakthroughs and trend-setting discoveries must also be transferable to a range of other applications. Above all, transferable innovations must comply with the principles of circularity and decarbonization, while demonstrating an awareness of the environmental impact of construction throughout a structure's use-cycle. Possible innovations could include:

 triggering advancements in architecture, urban design, landscape design, and territorial planning, in civil, urban, and environmental engineering, in the material sciences, in manual and digital manufacturing, or in other practices involved in the production of the built environment;
 introducing groundbreaking approaches to design, construction techniques, and material production, or experimental solutions for load-bearing structures, enclosures, mechanical systems, as well as building processes, operations, and maintenance;
 making original contributions to the improvement of social relations and livelihoods via pioneering user-oriented design propositions and novel use scenarios;
 establishing new monitoring methods for evaluating the project's objectives and its performance over time;
 applying novel means of disseminating research findings and practical know-how, including project documentation, communications and public outreach, as well as education and training programs.

Ethical standards and social inclusion - "People"
Projects must adhere to the highest ethical standards and promote social inclusion at all stages of the process, from planning and construction to use, servicing, renovation, and decommissioning. To ensure an enduring positive impact on communities, proposals must demonstrate how to enhance the collective realm and how affordable and socially-inclusive habitats can be sustained, including the fair distribution and management of resources. Possible contributions could include:

 adhering to ethical standards in all phases of a project's use-cycle;
 fostering the formation of socially-viable environments, strengthening of shared values, and enabling community empowerment;
 ensuring equal participation of stakeholders, including users, clients, neighborhood affiliations, co-operative members, state and local authorities, as well as non-governmental organizations;
 improving the quality of working conditions in the construction sector, whether pertaining to the provision of on-site amenities, fair compensation, adequate benefits, proper sanitation, and safety measures or guaranteeing
 gender parity and ethnic equality;
 increasing political transparency, promoting unbiased tender processes, demonstrating a commitment to principled interaction among involved parties, upholding codes of conduct for contractors and suppliers, and endorsing just business practices, all in the effort to prevent corruption at any level of planning and construction processes.

Resource and environmental performance - "Planet"
Projects must exhibit a sensible deployment and management of resources throughout their entire use-cycle. Long-term environmental concerns, especially in view of optimizing circular flows of material, water, and energy, should be an integral part of the design and construction approach to minimize greenhouse gas emissions, reduce waste, and promote the use of regenerative resources throughout the industry. Possible approaches could include:

 minimizing a project's ecological footprint and maximizing its positive impact on the environment through more lean input-output cycles;
 devising environmentally-conscious land use strategies and policies that preserve the existing landscape and at the same take water and wildlife preservation as well as land reclamation into account;
 emphasizing the use of renewable energy in construction as well as in the 
 use and upkeep of the built fabric to lower carbon emissions;
 deploying renewable material resources, while mining existing building stocks, minimizing the consumption of water, and reducing waste;
 using resilient, durable, and environmentally-sound technologies, developing robust construction details, and ensuring the optimal interaction of building systems.

Economic viability and compatibility - "Prosperity"
Projects must be economically feasible and able to secure financing, whether from public, commercial, co-operative or concessional sources, while having a positive impact on the social and physical environment. An economy of means in construction must be pursued in order to avoid the wasteful consumption of materials and limit  emissions. The products used as well as construction processes deployed must adhere to the logic of circular economies. Possible strategies could include:

 relying on legitimate and transparent funding sources, while guaranteeing that any revenues generated are lawfully declared and benefit stakeholder communities as well as the public at large;
 conceiving the project in view of its links to broader economic frameworks of local, regional, national, and global monetary flows;
 seeking robust economic models that take unpriced external costs into consideration from the outset;
 demonstrating a project's flexibility to adapt to future changes of user needs, ownership, laws, and regulations, not to mention adaptability to economic fluctuations;
 introducing long-term economic incentives for reducing waste and harmful emissions throughout a project's entire use-cycle.

Contextual and aesthetic impact - "Place"
Projects must convey a high standard of architectural quality in responding to the social and environmental urgencies of the present and those to come. With space, form, and aesthetic impact of utmost significance, the material manifestation of the design must make a positive and lasting contribution to the local context as a prevalent form of cultural expression. Possible measures could include:

 improving existing contextual socio-spatial conditions;
 fostering interdependencies of landscape, infrastructure, urban fabric, and architecture;
 working with the given building stock through sensitive restoration, reuse, or remodeling of the built environment;
 inventing programmatic strategies in terms of new uses, multiplicity of functions, short-term flexibility, and long-term adaptability;
 cultivating architectural excellence and aesthetic impact, specifically with regard to spatial ambiance, sequences of movement, inside-outside relationships, material tactility, light variation, and related place-making qualities.

Organisation and management

Board of the Holcim Foundation 
The Board of the Holcim Foundation ensures that the activities of the Holcim Foundation are aligned with current interpretations of sustainable construction, and also inspires the Foundation's approach by framing the architectural, scientific, cultural, and policy concerns that are integrated into its initiatives. The Board defines the strategies through which the Holcim Foundation encourages innovative approaches to sustainable construction. The members of the Board of the Holcim Foundation are:

 Maria Atkinson (chairperson), Sustainability Business Advisor and Founding CEO, Green Building Council of Australia
 Marilyne Andersen, Professor of Sustainable Construction Technologies and Dean of Architecture, Civil & Environmental Engineering (ENAC), École Polytechnique Fédérale de Lausanne (EPFL), Switzerland 
 Magali Anderson, Chief Sustainability & Innovation Officer (CSIO) and a member of the executive committee of Holcim
 Alejandro Aravena, executive director, Elemental, Chile
 Kate Ascher, Principal, BuroHappold Engineering; and Milstein Professor of Urban Development, Columbia Graduate School of Architecture, Planning and Preservation, USA
 Meisa Batayneh Maani, Founder and Principal Architect, Maisam Architects & Engineers, Jordan
 Harry Gugger, Professor Emeritus of Architectural & Urban Design, École Polytechnique Fédérale de Lausanne (EPFL), Switzerland
 Jan Jenisch, CEO of Holcim, Switzerland
 Stuart Smith, Director, Arup, United Kingdom
 Brinda Somaya, Principal Architect & Managing Director, Somaya & Kalappa Consultants, India

Academic Committee and associated universities
Associated universities of the Foundation host the forums, define the evaluation criteria to be used for the Holcim Awards, and put together the panels that judge the competition entries. The Swiss Federal Institute of Technology (ETH Zurich) and École Polytechnique Fédérale de Lausanne lead the Academic Committee which provides academic and technical support.

Associated universities
 The American University in Cairo (AUC), Egypt
 American University of Beirut (AUB), Lebanon
 l’École d’Architecture de Casablanca (EAC), in Casablanca, Morocco
 Illinois Institute of Technology (IIT Chicago), in Chicago, USA
 Massachusetts Institute of Technology (MIT) in Cambridge, Massachusetts, USA
 National University of Singapore (NUS), in Singapore
 Swiss Federal Institute of Technology (ETH Zurich) and École Polytechnique Fédérale de Lausanne (EPFL), Switzerland
 Tongji University in Shanghai, China
 Tsinghua University in Beijing, China
 Universidade de São Paulo (USP) in São Paulo, Brazil
 Universidad Iberoamericana (IBERO), in Mexico City, Mexico
 University of British Columbia, in Vancouver, Canada
 University of Melbourne, Australia
 University of the Witwatersrand in Johannesburg, South Africa

References

Sources

Sustainability organizations
Architecture organizations
Environmental organisations based in Switzerland
Foundations based in Switzerland
Organisations based in Zürich
2003 establishments in Switzerland
Organizations established in 2003
Holcim Group